Eudontomyzon stankokaramani, the Drin brook lamprey, is a non-predatory, freshwater resident species of lamprey found in the Drin river system of Albania and Kosovo and the basins of Lakes Ohrid and Shkodra.

References
 HOLČÍK, Juraj & ŠORIĆ, Vitko. "Redescription of Eudontomyzon stankokaramani (Petromyzontes, Petromyzontidae) – a little known lamprey from the Drin River drainage, Adriatic Sea basin."  Folia Zoologica – 53(4): 399–410 (2004) http://www.ivb.cz/folia/53/4/399-410_MS1049.pdf

Specific

stankokaramani
Fish described in 1974